Rowans are a genus (or subgenus) of deciduous trees.

Rowan may also refer to:

Places

Iran
 Rowan, Iran, a village in Hamadan Province

United States
 Rowan, Iowa, a city
 Rowan County, Kentucky
 Rowan County, North Carolina

Outer space
 4599 Rowan, a main belt asteroid discovered in 1985

People
 Rowan (name), a surname and personal name

Arts and entertainment

Fictional characters
 Rowan Blackshaw, on The Returned (U.S. TV series)
 Rowan Mayfair, in the Anne Rice Lives of the Mayfair Witches series of novels
 the title character of Rowan of Rin, a series of five children's fantasy novels by Emily Rodda
 Rowan Freemaker, in Lego Star Wars: The Freemaker Adventures
 Rowan Whitethorn, a character in the Throne of Glass book series by Sarah J. Maas
 Rowan Damisch, one of the two main characters in the Scythe (novel) book series by Neal Shusterman

Literature
 The Rowan, a novel by Anne McCaffrey

Music
 The Rowans, also known as The Rowan Brothers, an American country-rock group
 The Rowans (album), a 1975 album by The Rowans
 Rowan, a 2006 album by Maggie Reilly

Businesses
 Rowan Companies, a defunct offshore drilling contractor, now part of Valaris plc
 Rowan Software, a British computer game development company

Schools
 Rowan University in Glassboro, New Jersey, United States
 Rowan College at Burlington County, Mount Laurel, New Jersey, United States
 Rowan College of South Jersey, Sewell, New Jersey, United States

Ships
 , four US Navy vessels
 HMS Rowan, a First World War armed boarding steamer of the Royal Navy
 HMS Rowan, a Second World War Royal Navy Tree class trawler

Other uses
 Rowan steam railmotor, a steam railcar
 Rowan Hall, Miami University, Oxford, Ohio, United States

See also
 Rowan Museum, Salisbury, North Carolina, United States
 Rowan Oak, William Faulkner's former home in Oxford, Mississippi, United States
 Rawan (disambiguation)